Vijay Balasubramanian (born 1969) is a theoretical physicist and the Cathy and Marc Lasry Professor of Physics and Astronomy at the University of Pennsylvania. He has conducted research in string theory, quantum field theory, and biophysics (especially theoretical and computational neuroscience). He has also worked on problems in statistical inference and machine learning.

Biography 
Vijay Balasubramanian was born in Bombay, India, and spent his childhood in Indian cities including Bombay (Mumbai), New Delhi, Madras (Chennai), Calcutta (Kolkata), and Hyderabad.  Among the elementary schools he attended are St. Mary's in Bombay, St. Xavier’s in Calcutta, and St. Columba’s in New Delhi.  His family later moved to Jakarta, Indonesia, where he attended Jakarta International School (JIS).  After graduating from JIS, he moved to the United States and attended the Massachusetts Institute of Technology (MIT), where he earned B.S. degrees in Physics and Computer Science and an M.S. degree in Computer Science. While a student at MIT, he worked at CERN (the European Organization for Nuclear Research) and the Xerox Palo Alto Research Center (Xerox PARC). For this work at Xerox PARC, he received two patents in speech recognition.

Vijay Balasubramanian completed his doctoral studies at Princeton University, where he received a Ph.D. in Physics in 1997 under the supervision of Curtis Callan. He then moved to Harvard University as a Junior Fellow of the Harvard Society of Fellows.  During this time, he was also a fellow-at-large of the Santa Fe Institute. Since 2000, he has been a professor at the University of Pennsylvania where he currently holds the Cathy and Marc Lasry Chair in Physics and where he has a secondary appointment in the School of Medicine, Department of Neuroscience. In 2013, he co-founded the Computational Neuroscience Initiative at Penn.

In October 2021, he was a featured speaker in the Netflix documentary series Explained, in the episode on "Time."  In 2022, Quanta Magazine featured him in an article and video in which he discussed connections between physics, computer science, neurosciences, and humanities fields such as literature.  Quanta described him as a "polymath who is prone to leaping from string theory to Proust in mid-conversation."

Affiliations 
Vijay Balasubramanian has been a research associate and visiting professor at many institutions.  These include Rockefeller University; the City University of New York (CUNY) Graduate Center; the École Normale Supérieure (ENS) in Paris, France; the International Centre for Theoretical Physics (ICTP) in Trieste, Italy; and the Vrije Universiteit Brussel (VUB) in Brussels, Belgium.  In 2007–8, he was a fellow at the Institute for Advanced Study (IAS) (Princeton), supported by an IAS grant from Helen and Martin Chooljian.  Since 2011, he has been a General Member of the Aspen Center for Physics in Aspen, Colorado. In 2022, he became an External Professor of the Santa Fe Institute.

Honors 
Vijay Balasubramanian has won many prizes and fellowships. In 2005, Balasubramanian won first prize in the Gravity Research Foundation essay competition, with his colleagues Don Marolf and Moshe Rozali for an essay on “Information Recovery from Black Holes”.  In 2006, he won the Ira H. Abrams Award for Distinguished Teaching – the highest teaching award given by the School of Arts and Sciences at the University of Pennsylvania. In 2012-13 he won a fellowship from the Fondation Pierre-Gilles de Gennes, which he held at the École Normale Supérieure (ENS) in Paris, France.  In 2015, Balasubramanian was part of the international team of string theorists, computer scientists, and quantum information theorists that won a major grant from the Simons Foundation in New York to investigate the emergence of the fabric of spacetime from information.  Their project is entitled, "It from Qubit: Simons Collaboration on Quantum Fields, Gravity, and Information".

In 2019, the American Physical Society honored Balasubramanian by recognizing him as a Fellow of the society.  His citation as a 2019 APS Fellow noted his "fundamental contributions clarifying the black hole information puzzle and black hole thermodynamics through work on the duality of quantum gravity and quantum field theory, and on black hole microscopics in theories of quantum gravity".

Students and Post-Doctoral Fellows 
Vijay Balasubramanian's PhD students have included Minxin Huang (University of Science and Technology, China), Bartlomiej (Bartek) Czech (Tsinghua University, Beijing, China), Xue-xin Wei (University of Texas, Austin), Klaus Larjo (Goldman-Sachs), Jason Prentice, Thomas Levi, Kristina Simmons, Charles Ratliff, John Briguglio, Kamesh Krishnamurthy, Alex Keinath (University of Illinois Chicago), Louis Kang (RIKEN Center for Brain Science), Arjun Kar, Matthew DeCross, Cathy Li, Ron Ditullio, and David Kersen.

He has mentored many postdoctoral fellows including Ann Hermundstad (Janelia Research Campus, HHMI), Gasper Tkacik (Institute of Science and Technology [IST], Austria), Patrick Garrigan (St. Joseph's University), Joan Simon (University of Edinburgh), Monica Guica (Institut de Physique Théoretique, Paris [Saclay]), Tiberiu Tesileanu (Flatiron Institute, New York), Serena Bradde (American Physical Society), Vijay Singh (North Carolina A&T State), Asad Naqvi (Goldman-Sachs), Onkar Parrikar (TIFR Mumbai), Gabor Sarosi, Charles Rabideau, Tomonori Ugajin (Kyoto University), Eugenio Piasini (SISSA), Gaia Tavoni (Washington University in St. Louis), Clélia de Mulatier (University of Amsterdam), Philipp Fleig, Menachem (Nachi) Stern, Edgar Shaghoulian (University of California, Santa Cruz), and Javier Magan (Instituto Balseiro, Bariloche, Argentina).

References

External links 
 

Living people
1969 births
Massachusetts Institute of Technology alumni
Princeton University alumni
Indian string theorists
People from Mumbai
Harvard Fellows
University of Pennsylvania faculty
MIT Department of Physics alumni
Fellows of the American Physical Society